Liverpool One bus station is located in Canning Place, Liverpool, England. Formerly known as the Paradise Street interchange, it was situated on Paradise Street close to Lord Street with access from the nearby Liverpool One shopping centre. It was re-built in November 2005 as part of the Liverpool Paradise Street re-development, and rebranded in September 2009.

On 15 January 2016 National Express relocated their coach services to Liverpool One Bus Station from the former Liverpool Coach Station on Norton Street. All ticket bookings and coach travel information are now provided in the Travel Centre at Liverpool One Bus Station.

Layout
There are 10 bays within the bus station as well as a crew depot. Each stand has full real time departure boards. There is also a travel centre selling multi-journey tickets as well as giving information.

Of the bays, one is a stop for terminating buses while the rest act as departure stands.

The list of stands used is available on the Merseytravel website, but it is mainly related to the direction of travel after leaving the bus station.

InterCity Buses: National Express coach services depart and arrive at Stands 1 & 2, Megabus and Flixbus use Stand 6 for their coach departures and arrivals.

References

Buildings and structures in Liverpool
Bus stations in Merseyside
Liverpool One Bus Station
Transport in Liverpool